McElroy Auditorium, also known as the Hippodrome, is a 5,155 permanent seat multipurpose arena located in Waterloo, Iowa.  The auditorium was built in 1919 and renovated in 1936, when the roof was raised, floor was excavated and additional seating was added.

In 2018, the name of the venue was officially changed back to the Hippodrome.

Arena Design
The auditorium has been in continuous operation since 1919, making it one of the oldest arenas in the country.  The arena contains 234 classic arena style box seats and a  art deco lobby.  With chairs placed on the arena floor, the arena holds up to 7,000 seated for concerts depending on stage configuration.   There are four large concession areas and a 150-seat restaurant.  For concerts, remote beverage stations are added along with an old milk truck that has been restored into a "hot rod" style beer truck with 8 tappers. There are 6 large modern dressing rooms and 5 large box office windows.

Usage

National Cattle Congress
The arena style auditorium, part of the National Cattle Congress complex, is used for trade shows, concerts, conventions, livestock shows, rodeos, meetings, sporting events and more.  It housed the USHL's Waterloo Black Hawks from their inception in 1962 until Young Arena opened in 1994 and the Iowa Stars (1969-70)  Central Professional Hockey League during the 1969-70 season.  It also hosted the Waterloo Hawks of the NBL, NBA, and NPBL from 1948 to 1951.

As a concert venue
The roof design and construction materials along with the room design make the venue well-suited for concerts acoustically. It has hosted a variety of acts such as Glenn Miller and his Orchestra, Red Skelton, Buddy Holly, Johnny Cash, KISS, Aerosmith, The Beach Boys, Garth Brooks, Miranda Lambert, Blake Shelton, Destiny's Child, Jason Aldean, Roy Clark, Rob Zombie, Disturbed, Dierks Bentley, Nelly and Gym Class Heroes among many others in the past years.

Photo gallery

References

External links
 National Cattle Congress
 NCC Facebook Page

Indoor arenas in Iowa
Convention centers in Iowa
Sports venues in Iowa
Buildings and structures in Waterloo, Iowa
National Basketball League (United States) venues
Former National Basketball Association venues
Waterloo Hawks
Tourist attractions in Black Hawk County, Iowa
1919 establishments in Iowa
Sports venues completed in 1919
Event venues established in 1919
Basketball venues in Iowa
Rodeo venues in the United States